Wichling (otherwise Wychling) is a village and civil parish within the local government district of Maidstone, in England. It lies near the top of the ridge of the North Downs and consists mainly of isolated farms and houses: the population is therefore small in number.

A small settlement was recorded in the Domesday Book as "Winchelsmere". The Lord of the manor was Hugh, nephew of Herbert ("the same Hugh") who held the land from the Bishop of Bayeux, at that time Odo of Bayeux. Before the Norman Conquest it had been worth 100 shillings (£5), but after the conquest was only worth 40 shillings (£2).

The parish church dedicated to St Margaret was begun in the 12th century and restored 1882–3 by Clarke.  The church has two bells set for swing chiming by lever, the earliest of which is from 1430 by John Walgrave of London.

The first tier of local government is a parish meeting.

Footnotes

References

External links

 St Margaret's Church, Wychling

Villages in Kent
Civil parishes in Kent